Saint-Léger-de-Peyre is a commune in the Lozère department in southern France.

Geography
The river Colagne flows southwestward through the southern part of the commune and crosses the village.

See also
Communes of the Lozère department

References

Saintlegerdepeyre